Edwin O'Donovan (June 11, 1914 – April 22, 2000) was an American art director. He won an Academy Award in the category Best Art Direction for the film Heaven Can Wait.

Selected filmography
 Heaven Can Wait (1978)

References

External links

American art directors
1914 births
2000 deaths
Best Art Direction Academy Award winners